Johann Rabie (born 8 March 1987) is a South African former road cyclist.

Major results

2005
 1st Circuit de la Région Wallonne
 8th Overall Tour de Lorraine
 8th Overall Driedaagse van Axel
2007
 2nd  Road race, African Cycling Championships
2008
 1st  Young rider classification Tour de Beauce
 National Under-23 Road Championships
2nd Road race
2nd Time trial
 6th Pick n Pay Amashovashova National Classic
2009
 2nd Giro del Capo I
 3rd Giro del Capo II
 National Under-23 Road Championships
3rd Road race
3rd Time trial
 6th Overall Tour de Kumano
2010
 1st Dome 2 Dome Roadrace
 1st Stage 2 Jelajah Malaysia
 9th Tour de Delhi
2011
 2nd Overall Tour of South Africa
 3rd Overall Tour du Maroc
1st Stage 1
 9th Tour de Mumbai I
2012
 National Road Championships
3rd Road race
3rd Time trial
2013
 National Road Championships
2nd Road race
3rd Time trial

References

1987 births
Living people
South African male cyclists
20th-century South African people
21st-century South African people